Sir Thomas Erskine Holland KC, FBA (17 July 183524 May 1926) was a British jurist.

After school at Brighton College and studies at Oxford, he practiced law as a barrister from 1863 onwards. In 1874, he returned to Oxford, succeeding William Blackstone as Vinerian Reader. Later, he became professor of international law and fellow of All Souls College.

His prolific scholarly work, including an often-cited treatise in legal philosophy (Elements of Jurisprudence, 1880), his co-founding and editorship of Law Quarterly Review and his service as a university judge earned him the titles of a King's Counsel and a Fellow of the British Academy, as well as a knighthood in 1917.

His son, Sir Robert Erskine Holland, was an administrator in British India.

There is a memorial tablet to him in the chapel of Brighton College.

Notes

References

External links

 
 

 

1835 births
1926 deaths
English King's Counsel
Fellows of the British Academy
Knights Bachelor
19th-century King's Counsel
Fellows of All Souls College, Oxford
Chichele Professors of Public International Law
English legal scholars
Burials at Wolvercote Cemetery